Budweiser Gardens is a sports-entertainment centre, in London, Ontario, Canada – the largest such centre in Southwestern Ontario. Until 2012, it was known as the John Labatt Centre.

The John Labatt Centre, which opened on October 11, 2002, was named after John Labatt, founder of the Labatt brewery in London. Labatt still has a large brewery in London to the present day, although its head office was moved to Toronto in the early 1990s. The John Labatt Centre's name was changed to Budweiser Gardens (after Labatt's sister brand in AB InBev) in Fall 2012, as approved by London City Council on Tuesday, June 26, 2012 with a vote of 12–3.

The centre was built, in part, to be the new downtown home of London's Ontario Hockey League team, the London Knights, replacing the 40-year-old London Ice House in the south end of the city, near Highway 401.  Since 2011, it is home to London's National Basketball League of Canada team, the London Lightning.

History

The Talbot Inn
Budweiser Gardens million-dollar facade at its northeast corner is a replica of the Talbot Inn using "retumbled" yellow brick (new yellow bricks that have been scuffed up and scarred to appear old).

The Talbot Inn is a 19th-century building that stood on the site for more than 125 years—a designated heritage property under the Ontario Heritage Act (facade only via a registered heritage easement).

Originally planning to re-use the old bricks from the Talbot Inn on the northeast facade of Budweiser Gardens, the City of London suddenly had the building demolished on the morning of Sunday, June 3, 2001—without a demolition permit or delisting the Talbot Inn's facade as a designated heritage property.

Instead, the City of London had previously obtained a "heritage alteration permit", permits which are routinely used for minor changes to heritage properties, changes that don't affect the by-law reasons for designation.

According to officials with the Ontario Heritage Foundation (now called the Ontario Heritage Trust), it is the first known time in Ontario's history and possibly Canada's, that a "heritage alteration permit" was misused to outright demolish a designated heritage property.

The rationale cited by civic officials was that the Talbot Inn bricks were not salvageable due to their moisture content after a contractor had power-washed the paint off the bricks. Some of the original bricks, however, were used for the interior walls of the restaurant on Budweiser Gardens second level and the rest were trucked to TRY Recycling in London where they were re-sold.

No charges were ever laid against the City of London under the Ontario Heritage Act for the unusual demolition and the facade of the Talbot Inn remained designated under the Ontario Heritage Act for approximately 17 months after it was demolished.

The "Talbot Tot"
Prior to the construction of Budweiser Gardens during an archaeological assessment of the property, the skeletal remains of an infant, believed to be from the 1830s or 1840s, were found in the soil at the site. The discovery caused an uproar and delayed construction for a few months and likely contributed to the sudden demolition of the Talbot Inn in 2001. The human remains were dubbed the "Talbot Tot" and subsequently were reinterred at Oakland (pioneer) Cemetery on Oxford Street West in London.

Ownership and management
Budweiser Gardens is leased from the City of London by the London Civic Centre Corporation, an example of a public-private partnership.  The London Civic Centre Corporation is owned in turn by EllisDon and Global Spectrum, the Philadelphia-based subsidiary of Comcast the American cable company.  Global Spectrum also manages the Budweiser Gardens and operates more than 100 other arenas, stadiums and convention centres. Because of this, the Philadelphia Flyers, a corporate cousin of Global Spectrum, customarily have played a preseason game at Budweiser Gardens each year.

Seating and ticketing
Approximate capacities:
 9,046 - Hockey
 9,000 - End stage concert
 3,200 - Theatre mode (smaller concert)
 2,800 - Theatre mode (with proscenium)
 10,200 - Centre stage concert

In addition to the standard end stage configuration for large concerts, the arena can be set up to accommodate touring Broadway shows or smaller concerts in its theatre mode. The theatre mode features a small, intimate atmosphere and a 30-line fly grid to suspend scenery or lighting and sound.

When the sports-entertainment centre was originally being planned, estimates for sports seating were as low as 6,500 and high as 12,000 before settling on the original 9,090. It was decided due to several smaller arenas in the 4,000 to 7,000 range struggling financially and the cost on construction nearly doubling to have 12,000 or more seats. The sports-entertainment centre features 38 luxury suites and 1,100 club seats.

Budweiser Gardens complies with the Ontarians with Disabilities Act and has 55% more public washrooms than required by the law.

Cost and construction

Budweiser Gardens was built at a cost of approximately $42 million by the London, Ontario-based construction company EllisDon Corp., builders of Toronto's Rogers Centre. The City of London contributed $32 million for arena construction and $10 million to purchase the land, while the London Civic Centre Corporation added $9.5 million to the arena's construction.

The sports-entertainment centre was originally named the John Labatt Centre, after the Labatt Brewing Company which has a production plant in London, until 2012 when their 10-year naming rights expired. The Labatt Brewing Company had an exclusive first rights on a second deal and could change the name if they chose, which they did, to Budweiser Gardens to further promote the main brand of their sister corporation, Anheuser-Busch. The original deal was $5-million for 10 years and the deal signed in 2012 was $6.4 million for 10 years.  Global Spectrum, which manages the sports-entertainment centre, was selected by the City of London to choose the naming rights and they used a subsidiary called Front Row Marketing. Proceeds from naming rights are put into the net revenue, though the exact divide of the amount going to the City of London and Global Spectrum is unknown.

Sporting  events
Within a few years of opening, the London Knights had a championship season in 2004–05 and the centre was well positioned to take maximum advantage of the team's popularity.

Budweiser Gardens hosted the 2005 Memorial Cup, the Canadian Hockey League's national major junior championship series, which the Knights also won after winning the OHL championship. The arena also hosted the 2014 Memorial Cup, in which the Edmonton Oil Kings were champions defeating the Guelph Storm by a score of 6–3.

The University of Western Ontario Mustangs hockey team used Budweiser Gardens as their home arena from 2005 until 2007. They have since moved back to Thompson Arena.

In addition to hockey, the arena is used as home play arena for the London Lightning professional basketball team.

Budweiser Gardens is host to national-level events, such as the 2005 Canadian Figure Skating Championships, the 2006 Scott Tournament of Hearts (curling), the 2007 World Synchronized Skating Championships, the 2011 and 2023 Tim Hortons Brier (curling), as well as a wide variety of family entertainment such as Disney on Ice, the Harlem Globetrotters, Monster Jam (extreme motorsports) and Stars on Ice. It also hosted an international jousting tournament two years in a row, and the World Figure Skating Championships in 2013. The arena also hosted on September 22, 2014, an NHL preseason game between the Philadelphia Flyers and the Toronto Maple Leafs. Toronto won, 3–2, in a shootout.

Other events
The arena has also hosted many other well known artists and Broadway Shows. Budweiser Gardens was launched as a concert venue with Cher's "Living Proof: The Farewell Tour" in 2002. The tour returned for an encore performance in 2005. Sum 41 recorded their live album Go Chuck Yourself from their tour of the same name here on April 11, 2005. In 2007, Meat Loaf's "3 Bats Live" DVD from the "Seize The Night" tour was recorded here. Cirque du Soleil chose Budweiser Gardens to stage its first-ever arena show, a rebuilt production of Saltimbanco. Sting performed during his Symphonicities Tour on July 21, 2010, along with the Royal Philharmonic Orchestra.

In 2010, Budweiser Gardens was awarded as the Canadian Venue of the Year  at the Canadian Music and Broadcast Industry Awards.

The arena hosted the 2019 Juno Awards on March 17, 2019.

References

External links

Global Spectrum Facility Management
The OHL Arena & Travel Guide - John Labatt Centre
London Knights Web site
Budweiser Gardens

Indoor arenas in Ontario
Indoor ice hockey venues in Ontario
Ontario Hockey League arenas
Sports venues in London, Ontario
London Knights
London Lightning
Music venues in Ontario
Public–private partnership projects in Canada
Companies based in London, Ontario
Sports venues completed in 2002
2002 establishments in Ontario